Brenda Jackson (February 2, 1953) is an American novelist who writes contemporary multicultural romance novels.  She was the first African-American author to have a novel published as part of the Silhouette Desire line, and has seen many of her novels reach The New York Times and USAToday bestsellers lists. Jackson reached a milestone in her career in October 2013 when she published her 100th novel, becoming the first African American to achieve this milestone.

Biography
Brenda Jackson was born and raised in Jacksonville, Florida. She married Gerald, her high school sweetheart, in 1972 after graduating from high school. She went on to earn a degree in business administration from Jacksonville University, and to expand their family by having two sons, Gerald Jr., a Jacksonville-based filmmaker, and Brandon, who is a Political Officer in the US Foreign Service.

To relieve job-related stress in the early 1990s, Jackson began reading romance novels. Although she enjoyed the novels, she was dissatisfied with the lack of cultural and ethnic diversity in the characters. After complaining to her husband that she could do better, he registered her for a romance writers conference and encouraged her to try her hand at writing. At the conference, Jackson met then-unpublished authors Francis Ray and Rochelle Alers and became inspired to write.

Jackson was determined to write novels that are multicultural romances, featuring African-American characters, that "convey the belief that love is every[where]." Her first novel, Tonight and Forever was published in 1995. This and the next few books followed the fictional Madaris brothers, giving Jackson an opportunity to portray professional African-American men who were both "appreciative and respectful of women." Her heroes are in many ways inspired by her husband, whom she considers to be "a very strong African-American male [who] is supportive and centers his life around his family."

In 2001, Jackson released her first mainstream women's fiction novel, A Family Reunion.  As with her previous romance novels, this book contains a "sexy spark," as well as Jackson's familiar "polished and confident" writing style, which allows her "characters [to] burst with color right off the page."  The following year, in 2002, she became the first African-American author to have a novel published as part of the Silhouette Desire line.

Despite publishing 11 books in the first ten years of her writing career, as of 2005, Jackson considers writing to be her hobby, and she continues to work full-time as a manager at State Farm Insurance.

Throughout her writing career, Jackson has written for several publishers, including St.Martins Press, BET, Kensington, NAL, Harlequin/Silhouette and Harlequin Kimani Romance.

Recognition
Jackson has received awards and made accomplishments by being the first African-American author to have a book published under the Harlequin/Silhouette Desire line of books and the first African-American romance author to make USA Today's Bestsellers List and to make The New York Times Bestsellers List.

Jackson is the recipient of the RWA Nora Roberts Lifetime Achievement Award 2012, the highest honor bestowed by RWA in recognition of significant contributions to the romance genre. Additionally, she received the Sara Blocker Award 2012 from Florida Memorial University, the highest award given to a female for exceptional service to the university and for community service.  Additional she was a "NAACP Image Award Nominee" 2012 for Outstanding Literary Fiction for her novel, A Silken Thread.  She has won the Romantic Times Career Achievement Award and four of her books have been nominated for Romantic Times Reviewers' Choice.  One of her novels, One Special Moment, won the Reviewers' Choice Award in 1998 for Best Multicultural Romance.  She received twelve nominations at the Romance Slam Jam 2001's first annual Emma Awards, which recognize excellence in African-American literature.  Jackson won in six of her categories, Favorite Hero, Favorite Author, Favorite Book of the Year, Favorite Sequel Continuing Book Series, Favorite Anthologies, and Favorite All-Nighter.   The same year she also won the Romance In Color Award of Excellence for her novel Secret Love.

Jackson is a member of the First Coast Chapter of Romance Writers of America. She retired after 37 years in management for a major insurance company.

Jackson has added film-maker to her list of superlatives when in 2011, as an Executive Producer, she released a movie based on her novella, "Truly Everlasting." This movie is based on her beloved Madaris Series novel. Partnering with her son, Gerald Jackson, Jr.'s film company - Five Alive Films, she released the movie, Truly Everlasting, to DVD in November 2011.  The movie also included a soundtrack of 10 original songs by BreMaDa Productions, as well as the reissuance of a commemorative edition of the novel, Truly Everlasting.  The movie was filmed in Jacksonville, Florida.

Bibliography

The Madaris Family and Friends series (1995–)
 Tonight and Forever -  September, 1995 (Madaris Family & Friends)
 A Valentine Kiss Anthology - Cupid’s Bow -  February, 1996 
 Whispered Promises – August, 1996 (Madaris Family & Friends)
 Eternally Yours  - October, 1997
 One Special Moment   - May 1998
 Fire and Desire  -  August, 1999
 Something to Celebrate Anthology (Truly Everlasting)  -  December 1999
 Secret Love  -  January,  2000
 True Love -  September, 2000
 Surrender – July 2000
 The Best Man Anthology - Strictly Business – February, 2003
 The Midnight Hour – April, 2004
 The Madaris Saga – BET's Anniversary Collector's Edition, November 2004.  This 3-books-in-1 collection contains Tonight and Forever, Whispered Promises and Eternally Yours
 Unfinished Business –April, 2005
 Slow Burn  (A Madaris Novel)  - November 2007
 A Taste of Passion (Luke Madaris) – June 2009
 Sensual Confessions (Blade Madaris) – April 2010
 Inseparable (Reese Madaris) May 2011
 Courting Justice (New Madaris novel featuring Peyton Mahoney & DeAngelo DiMeglio, friends of the Madaris Family) June 2012
 Dreams of Forever (2-in-1 reissue featuring Seduction Westmoreland Style and Spencer's Forbidden Passion) July 2012
 All He Desires (Collection of special Brenda Jackson stories from Madaris Publishing; includes reissues from the Big Girl Series + 1 brand new story) September 2012
 A Very Merry Romance (Madaris Series) (Volume 21) November 2017
 Best Laid Plans (Madaris Family Saga) February 2018

The Steele series (2006–) 
 Solid Soul  (A Steele Novel) July 2006
 Night Heat  (A Steele Novel) September 2006
 Beyond Temptation (A Steele Novel) - January 2007
 Risky Pleasures  (A Steele Novel) - April 2007
 Irresistible Forces (Taylor Steele) – May 2008
 Quade's Babies (Quade Westmoreland & Cheyenne Steele) – December 2008
 Intimate Seduction (Donovan Steele) – July 2009
 Hidden Pleasures (Galen Steele) – June 2010
 A Steele for Christmas (Eli Steele) – October 2011
 Private Arrangements (New Steele book featuring Jonas Steele) February 2012
 Possessed by Passion (Tyson Steele) March 2016
 Guilty Pleasure: A Steele Family and Friends Novel (Steele Family Series) (Volume 13) May 2017

The Westmoreland series (2002–)
 Delaney's Desert Sheikh  - November 2002
 A Little Dare  - September, 2003
 Thorn’s Challenge – December, 2003
 Stone Cold Surrender – August 2004
 Riding The Storm – December, 2004
 Jared’s Counterfeit Fiancée, May 2005
 The Chase Is On, November, 2005
 The Durango Affair, May 2006
 Ian’s Ultimate Gamble, August 2006
 Seduction, Westmoreland Style  (A Westmoreland Novel) February 2007
 Spencer's Forbidden Passion  (A Westmoreland Novel) December 2007
 Taming Clint Westmoreland (Clint Westmoreland) – February 2008
 Cole's Red-Hot Pursuit (Cole Westmoreland) – June 2008
 Tall, Dark…Westmoreland (Reggie Westmoreland & Olivia Jeffries ) & (Book #1 of The Jeffries Family Series) – March 2009
 Westmoreland's Way (Dillon Westmoreland) November 2009
 Tis The Season …for Romance – Collection of 4-Brand New Stories including Uncle Corey Westmoreland's story – December 2009 
 Wrapped In Pleasure – 2-in-1 Books; Reprint of Delaney's Desert Sheikh (1st Westmoreland Series Book) + New Madaris Series Book (Sheikh Rasheed Valdemon), Seduced by A Stranger – January 2010
 Hot Westmoreland Nights (Ramsey Westmoreland) – March 2010
 What A Westmoreland Wants (Gemma Westmoreland) – September 2010
 A Wife For A Westmoreland (Derringer Westmoreland) – April 2011
 The Proposal (Jason Westmoreland) June 2011
 Feeling the Heat (Micah Westmoreland) April 2012
 Texas Wild (Megan Westmoreland & Rico Claiborne) October 2012
 One Winter's Night (Riley Westmoreland) December 2012

The Westmoreland Legacy series
 The Rancher Returns (Gavin “Viper” Blake ) October 2016
 His Secret Son (Laramie “Coop” Cooper) November 2017
 An Honourable Seduction (The Westmoreland Legacy Ministries) May 2018

The Granger series
 A Brother’s Honor (Jace Granger) June 2013
 A Man's Promise (The Grangers) (Volume 2) October 2014
 A Lover’s Vow (Dalton Granger) April 2015
 Captivated by Love (The Grangers) (Volume 4) December 2016

The Protectors series (continuation of The Granger series)
 Forged in Desire (Lamar “Striker” Jennings) January 2017
 Seized by Seduction (Quasar Patterson) April 2017
 Locked in Temptation (Stonewall Courson) July 2017

Other titles
 Welcome to Leo's Anthology (Main Agenda) - November, 2000
 Family Reunion – November, 2001
 Perfect Timing – May, 2002
 Perfect Fit  - May 2003
 Ties That Bind  - November 2002
 A Lover’s Touch – (an e-Harlequin on-line read) – October 2002
 The Living Large Anthology - Bare Essentials – January, 2003
 The Savvy Sistahs – November, 2003
 A Whole Lotta Love – January 2004
 Scandal Between the Sheets - April, 2004
 Let’s Get It On –The Playa's Handbook – November, 2004
 Big Girls Don’t Cry – January, 2005
 The All Night Man – February, 2005
 Strictly-Confidential Attraction  – September 2005
 When You Least Expect It, September 2005
 No More Playas, October 2005
 Mr. Satisfaction, January 2006
 Taking Care of Business, February 2006
 Never Too Late – May, 2006 (e-Harlequin on-line read)
 What A Woman Wants - January 2007
 In Bed with Her Boss -  August 2007
 Stranded with the Tempting Stranger - October 2007
 Forever Mine Anthology (Includes Cupid's Bow + 2 new stories, The Sweetest Taboo & Perfect Moments) – February 2008
 Her Little Black Book – April 2008
 Just Desserts – (Part of a 3-book Continuity Series, The Three Mrs. Fosters), July 2008
 Winning The Race – NASCAR Holiday 3 – November 2008
 The Object of His Protection – (Part of a 4-book Continuity Series, The Braddock's Secret Son) November 2008
 Essence of Desire Anthology (Includes: Truly Everlasting + 2 new stories, The Makeover & Bound by Passion) – January 2009
 Temperatures Rising – (Part of a 3-Book Continuity Series, Mother Nature Matchmaker) & (Book #2 of The Jeffries Family Series) May 2009
 Some Like It Hot Special Collector's 5-books-In-1 (Includes: Strictly Business/The Best Man; Main Agenda/Welcome To Leo's; Irresistible Attraction/Let's Get It On; The Hunter/The All Night Man & Extreme Satisfaction/Mr. Satisfaction – October 2008
 One Night With A Wealthy Rancher – August 2009
 Bachelor Untamed (Bachelor In Demand Series Book 1 - Uriel Lassiter's story) – October 2009
 Spontaneous – (Jefferies Family Series #3) May 2010; Reprint November 2011 w/ Temptation
 In Too Deep (Part of 3-Books w/2-Novels-In-1 Continuity Series A Summer for Scandal) July 2010
 Star of His Heart (Part of a 4-Book Continuity Series, Love In The Limelight) – August 2010
 Bachelor Unleashed (#2 Bachelor In Demand Series - Xavier Kane's story) – December 2010
 A Silken Thread – March 2011 (NAACP IMAGE AWARD NOMINEE)
 In The Doctor's Bed (Part of a 4-Book Continuity Series, Hopewell General), August 2011
 Temptation (Part of the Texas Cattleman's Club Continuity Series: The Showdown ) 2-in-1 includes Reprint of Spontaneous – November 2011
 Bachelor Undone (Book #3 Bachelor In Demand Series - York Ellis) December 2011 
 Promises of Seduction (2-in-1 reissue – featuring Durango Affair and Ian's Ultimate Gamble) January 2012
 Love Bites (anthology with Lori Foster, Catherine Mann, Jules Bennett and Virna DePaul - May 2012 
 Bachelor Undone August 2013

See also

List of romantic novelists

References

Bibliography of Brenda Jackson

External links
 Official site
 Brenda_Jackson page at Ereader.com
 Brenda Jackson´s Spanish ebooks

Living people
20th-century American novelists
21st-century American novelists
American women novelists
American romantic fiction writers
African-American novelists
1953 births
Jacksonville University alumni
Women romantic fiction writers
20th-century American women writers
21st-century American women writers
20th-century African-American women writers
20th-century African-American writers
21st-century African-American women writers
21st-century African-American writers